The 2000 USL Premier Development League season was the 6th PDL season. The season began in April 2000 and ended in August 2000.

Chicago Sockers finished the season as national champions, beating Mid-Michigan Bucks 1-0 in the PDL Championship game. Westchester Flames had finished with the best regular season record in the league, winning 15 out of their 18 games, suffering just three losses, and finishing with a +26 goal difference.

Changes from the 1999 season

Rules
This is the first year that the PDL used ties in the standings, whereas previous seasons employed a shootout.

Name changes
The following teams changed their name:
 The West Michigan Explosion became the West Michigan Edge.

New teams
10 New teams were added, including 8 expansion teams:

Folding
Eight teams folded before the season:
 Clarksville Gunners
 Jackson Chargers
 Miami Tango
 New York Capital District Shockers
 Orlando Nighthawks
 Silicon Valley Ambassadors
 Sioux City Breeze
 Tucson Amigos

Standings

Central Conference

Great Lakes Division

Heartland Division

Provisional Teams

Eastern Conference

Northeast Division

Southeast Division

Western Conference

Rocky Mountain Division

Northwest Division

Southwest Division

Playoffs

Format 
Mid-Michigan won the PDL Regular Season title and a bye to the National Semi-Finals. This moved Dayton up to the Great Lakes Division first place spot and allowed West Michigan into the playoffs, taking the second place spot for the division.

For the Central and Eastern divisions, the top seeds from each division face the second place team from the opposite division.  For the Western Conference, the division champion with the most points will play the wild card, while the two remaining division champions play each other.

Conference playoffs

PDL championship

References

2000
4
2000 in Canadian soccer